Siegfried Meier (born August 9, 1977) is a musician, record producer, and recording, mixing and mastering engineer. Meier is known for his work in the genres of rock, metal, pop, and punk, producing and engineering for groups such as Face to Face, Kittie, Sectorseven, and Baptized in Blood. In 2013, Meier won a Juno award for Metal/Hard Music Album of the Year producing and engineering Woods 5: Grey Skies & Electric Light by Woods of Ypres. Meier is the owner of Ontario-based recording studio, Beach Road Studios.

Early life
Born in Oberviechtach, Germany, Meier moved to Canada at a young age. There, he began to develop an interest in music, specifically in recording his own songs. In high school, Meier played in local bands and began collecting recording equipment in order to record their efforts. In 1998, Meier pursued a degree in Audio Engineering. He attended the Ontario Institute of Audio Recording Technology, where he also worked after his degree was completed as the school's Pro Tools and Audio Production instructor.

EMAC Recording Studios
Meier briefly worked in Los Angeles before returning to Ontario to work at EMAC Recording Studios. He spent from 2000 to early 2004 engineering and mastering various albums for EMAC before returning to teach at OIART.

In 2001 Meier engineered a session for Kittie's album Oracle at EMAC Studios. He also engineered, mixed and mastered Sectorseven by Sectorseven in 2002.

Beach Road Studios
In 2006, Meier began building his own studio, Beach Road, in Goderich. This studio was crafted with the help of Lee While, an acoustics professor at the Ontario Institute of Audio Recording Technology as well as Robbie McCowan of Chasing Mercury. During this time, Meier continued to produce out of his own home. Albums such as Folkyo by Dayna Manning credit the facilities being used for recording the album as “Siegfried Meier’s House”. Here, he also produced, engineered and mixed Baptized In Blood's Baptized In Blood EP as well as Article One's AO. Once Beach Road Studios was completed in late 2006, Meier migrated his production to the new facilities.

Work with Kittie
In 2009, Meier worked again with Kittie, this time producing as well as engineering at Beach Road Studios, on their album In The Black. The album was well-received, reaching No. 18 on the Hard Rock Albums Billboard chart and No. 133 on the Top 200 Billboard chart. Meier also produced and engineered Kittie's 2011 album I’ve Failed You, which reached No. 10 on the Hard Rock Albums Billboard chart and No. 178 on the Top 200 Billboard chart. In 2011, Meier also produced, engineered and mixed Take It or Leave It: A Tribute to the Queens of Noise – The Runaways which featured Kittie on the song “Fantasies”. In 2015, Kittie recorded a cover of David Bowie's “Space Oddity” for A Salute to the Thin White Duke – The Songs of David Bowie which was produced, engineered and mixed by Meier. Meier also worked with Kittie on the soundtrack for Saw VI in 2009, producing, engineering and mixing their song “Cut Throat”.

Most recently, Meier produced, engineered, and mixed Kittie's Origins/Evolutions Live album in 2018.

Work with Woods of Ypres
In 2011, Meier worked with Woods of Ypres at Beach Road Studios to produce and engineer their album, Woods 5: Grey Skies & Electric Light. The tracks were sent to mix engineer John Fryer to be mixed. However, after the album was recorded lead singer Dave Gold was killed in a car accident, halting the release of the album until the following year. The album was critically acclaimed, resulting in a nomination and win for the Juno Award for Metal/Hard Music Album of the Year.

Current Work
Meier continues to work out of Beach Road Studios, producing and mixing records as well as teaching classes on audio production. He also builds and modifies audio equipment under the brand Beach Road Electronics.

Meier's most recent project has been Face to Face's Hold Fast (Acoustic Sessions), which he co-produced, mixed, and featured on.  The album reached No. 18 on Alternative Album Sales and No. 40 on Rock Album Sales on Billboard's charts.

Endorsements 
Meier is endorsed by a variety of audio companies, including:

 Noble and Cooley
Magix
Radial Engineering
 HHB (Canada)
Peluso Microphone Lab
SJC Drums
The Amp Factory
Auratone Audio
Eventide Audio

Curtis
Meier is also co-founder and member of the melodic rock and punk band, Curtis. They have released various EPs and LPs over the years, namely Curtis in 1997, Thanks Stu in 1997, Live in the Studio 2004 in 2004, and Full Circle and Rarities, Randoms and Lost Souls in 2013. They are currently signed to Bright Side Records, and have been compared by Entertainment LA to groups such as Jawbreaker, Knapsack, and Sunny Day Real Estate.

Discography
P = Producer

E = Engineer

M = Mixing

ME = Mastering Engineer

S = Songwriter

MU = Musician

*** = listed on http://www.siegfriedmeier.com/discography/

All non-starred albums listed on AllMusic.com

References

1977 births
German male musicians
German record producers
Living people